= Kendema =

Coordinates: 36°17′00″N 29°58′58″E

Kendema was a town of ancient Lycia.

Its site is tentatively located near Gödeme, Asiatic Turkey.
